Kritsada Wongkaew, is a Thai professional futsal midfielder who plays for Thai League 2 club Nakhon Pathom United, on loan from Chonburi Bluewave and currently a member of  Thailand national futsal team.

References
 

Kritsada Wongkaeo
1988 births
Living people
Futsal defenders
Kritsada Wongkaeo
Kritsada Wongkaeo
Southeast Asian Games medalists in futsal
Competitors at the 2011 Southeast Asian Games
Thai expatriate sportspeople in Indonesia
Kritsada Wongkaeo